John Charles Pritzlaff Jr. (May 10, 1925 – May 2, 2005) was an American businessman, politician, and diplomat who served in both chambers of the Arizona State Legislature. He also served as the United States Ambassador to Malta from 1969 to 1972.

Early life and education
Pritzlaff was born in Milwaukee, Wisconsin. In 1958, Pritzlaff moved to Phoenix, Arizona, with his family. Pritlaff served in the United States Army during World War II. In 1947, he received his bachelor's degree in history and political science from Princeton University.

Career 
Prior to his political career, he was the Vice-President and General Manager of the John Pritzlaff Hardware Company in Milwaukee, founded by John C. Pritzlaff. In Phoenix, Pritzlaff owned the Rockmount Real Estate Investments. He was involved with the Republican Party in Wisconsin and Arizona.

He was a member of the Arizona House of Representatives from 1963 to 1969 and of the Arizona Senate from 1975 to 1982. He also served as the United States Ambassador to Malta from 1969 to 1972.

Personal life 
On February 10, 1951, Pritzlaff married Mary Dell Olin, the daughter of Spencer Truman Olin an executive at Olin Corporation. The family lived in Milwaukee, Wisconsin before moving to Phoenix, Arizona, in 1958. Their daughter Anne, married former Arizona Governor, Fife Symington.

Pritzlaff died on May 2, 2005 in Arizona.

References

1925 births
2005 deaths
Politicians from Phoenix, Arizona
Politicians from Milwaukee
Businesspeople from Phoenix, Arizona
Businesspeople from Milwaukee
Military personnel from Milwaukee
Princeton University alumni
Members of the Arizona House of Representatives
Ambassadors of the United States to Malta
Arizona state senators
Wisconsin Republicans
Arizona Republicans
20th-century American politicians
20th-century American businesspeople